Asim Ijaz Khwaja is a Pakistani-American economist who serves as Sumitomo-FASID Professor of International Finance and Development at Harvard Kennedy School, and director of Center for International Development (CID) at Harvard University since July 1, 2019.  He is co-founder of the Center for Economic Research in Pakistan (CERP) and also serves as co-Director of Harvard Evidence for Policy Design.
He is the first Pakistani hired by Harvard as professor.

Early life and education  
Asim was born to a Pakistani family in London, United Kingdom.  He was raised in UK before moving to Kano, Nigeria where he lived for eight years. He also lived in Lahore, Pakistan for eight years and attended Aitchison College. He moved to Cambridge, United States for higher education in 1991. Asim got a bachelor's degree in economics and mathematics with computer science from MIT in 1995. He received his PhD in economics from Harvard in 2001.

Professional life 

Asim joined Harvard University as assistant professor in June 2001. He also served as visiting faculty member at Yale University's Economic Growth Center from January 2005 to June 2005. In October of 2005, Asim released RISE-PAK, a searchable database for earthquake relief in Pakistan. He was promoted to associate professor at Harvard in June 2006 and professor in January 2010. He has also served as visiting faculty member at Walter A. Haas School of Business at University of California, Berkeley. His areas of interest include development economics, corporate finance, education, political economy, institutions, mechanism design/contract theory and industrial organization.

Personal life 
Asim is a citizen of Pakistan, the United Kingdom and the United States. He is married to Sehr Jalal and has three children. He enjoys playing Squash and interested in chaos and complexity theory.

References 

Massachusetts Institute of Technology alumni
Harvard University alumni
Pakistani emigrants to the United States
People with acquired American citizenship
American academics of Pakistani descent
Year of birth missing (living people)
Living people
British economists
British people of Pakistani descent